"You're My Sunshine" is Namie Amuro's fourth solo single under the Avex Trax label. Released in June 1996, it was her third consecutive single to debut at #1 and sell over a million copies.

Track listing
 "You're My Sunshine (Straight Run)" (Tetsuya Komuro) – 5:39
 "You're My Sunshine (Eddie Delena Dance Mix)" (Tetsuya Komuro) – 6:27
 "You're My Sunshine (TV Mix)" (Tetsuya Komuro) – 5:36

Production 
 Producer – Tetsuya Komuro
 Arranger – Tetsuya Komuro
 Chorus Arranger - Joey Johnson
 Mixing & Remix – Eddie DeLena

TV performances
June 7, 1996 – Music Station
June 10, 1996 – Hey! Hey! Hey! Music Champ
June 15, 1996 – CDTV
July 12, 1996 – Music Station
July 17, 1996 – Avex Dance Net '96
October 4, 1996 – Music Station Special
November 26, 1996 – P-Stock
December 16, 1996 – Asia Live Dream '96
December 21, 1996 – PopJam X'mas Special
December 27, 1999 – SMAP x SMAP

Charts
Oricon Sales Chart (Japan)

1996 singles
Namie Amuro songs
Songs written by Tetsuya Komuro
1996 songs
Avex Trax singles